Sundance is the fourth album recorded (but seventh released) by Chick Corea. It was recorded in 1969 but not issued until 1972 on the Groove Merchant label.  Like his previous album, it features trumpeter Woody Shaw, tenor saxophonist Bennie Maupin, flautist Hubert Laws, bassist Dave Holland and drummers Jack DeJohnette and Horace Arnold. In 2002, Blue Note re-released all of Corea’s 1969 sessions, including this album, together with all the tracks from Is (and alternate takes from both albums) as The Complete "Is" Sessions.

Track listing

Side one
"The Brain" (Chick Corea) – 10:09
"Song of Wind" (Corea) – 8:05

Side two
"Converge" (Corea) – 7:59
"Sundance" (Corea) – 10:02

Personnel 
 Chick Corea – piano
 Hubert Laws – flute, piccolo flute
 Bennie Maupin – tenor saxophone
 Woody Shaw – trumpet
 Dave Holland – bass
 Jack De Johnette – drums
 Horace Arnold – drums

See also 
 The Complete "Is" Sessions (Blue Note, 2002)

References

External links 
 Chick Corea - Sundance (rec. 1969, rel. 1972) album review by Scott Yanow, credits & releases at AllMusic
 Chick Corea - Sundance (rec. 1969, rel. 1972) album releases & credits at Discogs
 Chick Corea - Sundance (rec. 1969, rel. 1972) album to be listened as stream on Spotify
 Chick Corea - The Complete "Is" Sessions (rec. 1969, rel. 2002) album releases & credits at Discogs
 Chick Corea - The Complete "Is" Sessions (rec. 1969, rel. 2002) album to be listened as stream on Spotify

1972 albums
Chick Corea albums
Groove Merchant albums
Albums produced by Sonny Lester